The 2000 LG Chinese Football Super Cup (Chinese: LG杯2000年度中国足球超霸杯赛) was the sixth Chinese Football Super Cup, contested by Chinese Jia-A League 2000 winners Dalian Shide and 2000 Chinese FA Cup winners Chongqing Lifan. Dalian Shide won their second title after winning 4–1.

Match details

References 

2000 in Chinese football
2000